Gina D's Kids Club is an American educational children's television series broadcast on selected stations and networks.  It is seen across the U.S. on Trinity Broadcasting Network (TBN) and its digital subchannel Smile. It can also be seen on selected local stations. Gina Mourey played Gina D herself. The other characters have been played by Tim Trombitas, Austin Blay, and Joel Simser. 

Gina D's Kids Club is geared towards preschoolers from 2 to 6 years old and explores such topics as colors, shapes, and other subjects.

It was also broadcast on the Australian Christian Channel in Australia.

Episodes

Series overview

Season 1 (2004–2005)

Season 2 (2006–2007)

Specials (2004–2008)

Production
The series started pre-production in 2001 and had a budget of $1.8 million.

References

External links 

2000s American children's television series
2004 American television series debuts
2008 American television series endings
American preschool education television series
American television series with live action and animation
American television shows featuring puppetry
Christian children's television series
Trinity Broadcasting Network original programming
2000s preschool education television series